= Sleaze =

British euphemism for political corruption

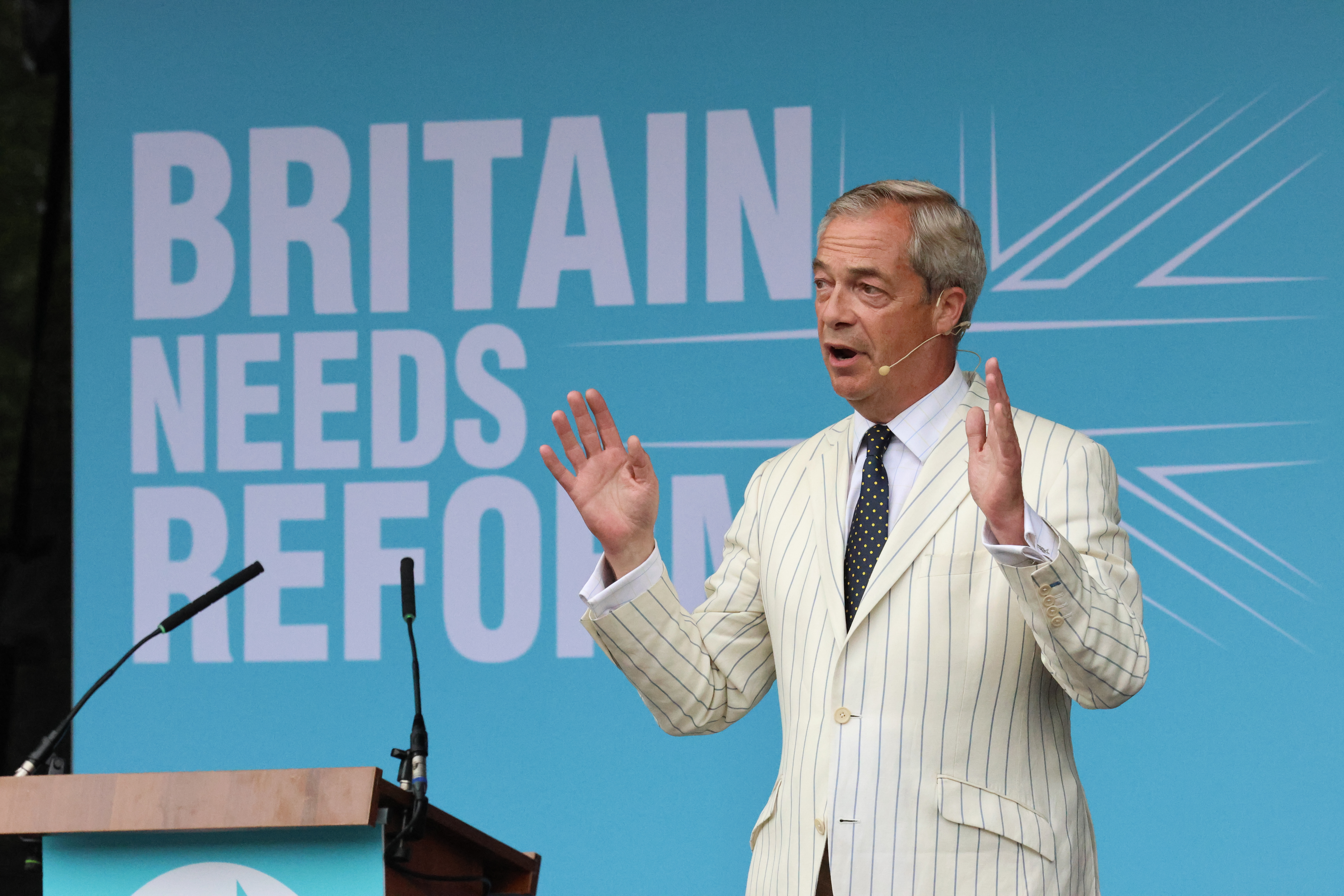
Nigel Farage is the current leader of the political party Reform UK. In 2014 during his second tenure as leader of UKIP, The Times published an article titled "Farage's party judged the worst for sleaze by voters".

Sleaze is a euphemism used in the United Kingdom for political corruption.

The term gained prominence during the late 1980s and early 1990s, particularly in relation to political scandals involving members of Parliament, especially when the media considered it socially unacceptable to directly accuse politicians of corruption. It was during this time that the British media began using "sleaze" to describe allegations of bribery, corruption, and inappropriate behavior among politicians. The term became firmly entrenched in the public lexicon, often invoked during periods of political controversy.
